The flag of the British Windward Islands was the flag of the Federal Colony of the Windward Islands. It was a Blue Ensign with the badge of the Governor-in-chief in the fly. The separate colonies under the Federal Colony each had their own ensigns. In 1903, the shape of the crown on the badge was changed slightly. The Governor-in-chief of the Windward Islands used a Union Flag defaced with the badge.

The Federal Colony of the Windward Islands became the Territory of the Windward Islands in June 1956, and was dissolved in 1960.

Gallery

Historical flags

Standard of the Governor-in-chief

See also
Former parts of Windward Islands
Flag of Grenada
Flag of Saint Lucia
Flag of Saint Vincent and the Grenadines
Flag of Dominica
Flag of the West Indies Federation
Flag of the British Leeward Islands

External links

Flag
Blue Ensigns
Obsolete national flags
Caribbean culture